Damuk Sport Club, is an Iraqi football team based in Wasit, that plays in Iraq Division Three.

Managerial history 
 Hasanain Mussa

See also 
 2021–22 Iraq Division Three

References

External links
 Iraq Clubs- Foundation Dates

1990 establishments in Iraq
Association football clubs established in 1990
Football clubs in Wasit